Sodium adipate is a compound with formula Na2C6H8O4. It is the sodium salt of adipic acid.

As a food additive, it has the E number E356 as is used as an acidity regulator.

References

Adipates
Organic sodium salts
Food acidity regulators
E-number additives